Anatrachyntis biorrhizae is a moth in the family Cosmopterigidae. It was described by Sinev in 1986, and is known from Russia.

References

Moths described in 1986
Anatrachyntis
Moths of Asia
Moths of Europe